The National People's Army (NVA ) were the armed forces of the German Democratic Republic (GDR) from 1956 to 1990.

From 1962, conscription was mandatory for all GDR males aged between 18 and 60 requiring an 18-month service, and it was the only Warsaw Pact military to offer non-combat roles to conscientious objectors, known as "construction soldiers". The NVA reached 175,300 personnel at its peak in 1987.

The majority of NATO officers rated the NVA the best military in the Warsaw Pact based on discipline, thoroughness of training, and the quality of officer leadership. The NVA did not see significant combat but participated in the Warsaw Pact invasion of Czechoslovakia in 1968, deployed military advisors to communist governments in other countries, and manned the Berlin Wall where they were responsible for numerous deaths. The NVA was dissolved on 2 October 1990 with the GDR before German reunification, and its facilities and equipment were handed over to the Bundeswehr (the armed forces of West Germany), which also absorbed most of its personnel below the rank of non-commissioned officer.

History 

This formation culminated years of preparation during which former  officers and communist veterans of the Spanish Civil War helped organize and train paramilitary units of the People's Police. Though the NVA featured a German appearance – including uniforms and ceremonies patterned after older German military traditions – its doctrine and structure showed the strong influence of the Soviet Armed Forces.

During its first year, about 27 percent of the NVA's officer corps had formerly served in the Wehrmacht. Of the 82 highest command positions, ex- officers held 61; however, very few of them had served in high ranks. The military knowledge and combat experience of these veterans were indispensable in the NVA's early years, although by the 1960s most of these World War II veterans had retired. (The West German  was even more reliant on  veterans, who initially comprised the majority of its commissioned ranks.)

Notable former  officers in the NVA command
The following list includes the NVA generals who were awarded the Knight's Cross of the Iron Cross in the  during the Second World War.

  Wilhelm Adam (17 December 1942 as )
  Otto Korfes (22 January 1943 as )
  Vincenz Müller (7 April 1944 as )

The following list includes the NVA generals who were awarded the German Cross in the Wehrmacht during the Second World War.

  Rudolf Bamler (12 March 1942 as )
  Bernhard Bechler (28 January 1943 as )
  Otto Korfes (11 January 1942 as )
  Arno von Lenski (21 January 1943 as )
  Vincenz Müller (26 January 1942 as  i.G.)
  Hans Wulz (25 January 1943 as )

In its first six years the NVA operated as an all-volunteer force. (West Germany, in contrast, re-introduced universal military service in 1956.) The GDR introduced conscription in 1962. According to the Parallel History Project on Cooperative Security:

Like the ruling communist parties of other Soviet satellites, the East German Socialist Unity Party of Germany (SED) assured control by appointing loyal party members to top positions and by organizing intensive political education for all ranks. The proportion of SED members in the officer corps rose steadily after the early 1960s, eventually reaching almost 95 percent.

The NVA saw itself as the "instrument of power of the working class". According to its doctrine, the NVA protected peace and secured the achievements of socialism by maintaining a convincing deterrent to imperialist aggression. The NVA's motto, inscribed on its flag, read: "For the Protection of the Workers and Farmers' Power".

The NVA never took part in full-scale combat, although it participated in a support role in the suppression of the Prague Spring of 1968, provided medical support during the Soviet–Afghan War, and NVA officers often served as combat advisers in Africa. Some of the first NVA advisors went to the Republic of the Congo in 1973. During the 1980s at various times the NVA had advisors in Algeria, Angola, Ethiopia, Guinea, Iraq, Libya, Mozambique, South Yemen, and Syria. When the Soviet Union prepared to occupy Czechoslovakia in 1968, the GDR government committed the 7th Panzer Division and the 11th Motorised Infantry Division to support the intervention (assigned to 20th Guards Army and 1st Guards Tank Army respectively), becoming the first deployment of German troops outside Germany for the first time since the Second World War. But the East German participation raised Czech ire, and the two divisions were "kept out of sight in the Bohemian forests" and allowed to travel only at night. In a few days they were withdrawn.

In the early 1970s the Group of Soviet Forces in Germany (GSFG) high command assigned to the NVA the wartime mission of capturing West Berlin. The NVA plan for the operation, designated "Operation Centre", called for some 32,000 troops in two divisions, accompanied by the GSFG's Soviet 6th Separate Guards Motor Rifle Brigade. The plan was regularly updated until 1988, when a less ambitious plan that simply aimed at containing Berlin was substituted.

In the autumn of 1981 the NVA stood ready to intervene in Poland in support of a possible Soviet invasion, but the declaration of martial law in Poland (13 December 1981) averted the crisis.

The NVA went into a state of heightened combat readiness on several occasions, including the construction of the Berlin Wall in 1961, the Cuban Missile Crisis in 1962, the 1968 invasion of Czechoslovakia, and, for the last time, in late 1989 as protests swept through the GDR.

Ideology 
The NVA operated as a professional volunteer army until 1962, when conscription was introduced. The GDR's National Defense Council controlled the armed forces, but the mobile forces came under the Warsaw Pact Unified Command. Political control of the armed forces took place through close integration with the Socialist Unity Party of Germany (SED), which vetted all officers. Military training (provided by the school system) and the growing militarization of East German society bolstered popular support for the military establishment. From a Leninist perspective, the NVA stood as a symbol of Soviet-East German solidarity and became the model communist institution – ideological, hierarchical, and disciplined. The NVA synthesized communist and Prussian symbolism, naming its officers' academy, the Friedrich Engels Military Academy, after Karl Marx's co-author Friedrich Engels, and its highest medal after Prussian Army General Gerhard von Scharnhorst.

During the Peaceful Revolution that led to the downfall of the GDR's communist government, some NVA forces were placed on alert but were never deployed against protesters. At the same time, the Soviet government ordered its troops in the GDR to remain in barracks. After the forced retirement of SED and state leader Erich Honecker and other conservatives from the ruling Politburo at the height of the crisis in October 1989, the new SED leadership ruled out using armed force against the protesters.

Composition 
The manpower of the NVA consisted of some 85,000 soldiers in 1962, climbed to 127,000 by 1967, and remained essentially steady through 1970. In 1987, at the peak of its power, the NVA numbered 175,300 troops. Approximately 50% of this number were career soldiers, while the others were short-term conscripts.

According to a 1973 study, NVA leaders from the late 1950s through the 1960s came predominantly from working-class backgrounds, with few from middle-class or professional families and no representatives of the aristocracy present in the upper echelons. Excepting specialized military or political instruction, most NVA leaders reported primary school as their highest level of formal education.

Post-unification 

The NVA disbanded with the dissolution of the East German government in October 1990. Under the process of "Army of Unity", NVA facilities and equipment were handed over to the Bundeswehr, the federal defense force of the unified Germany. Bundeswehr Eastern Command was set up for the control of units or facilities in the territory of former East Germany, and was led by Lieutenant General Jörg Schönbohm. Most facilities closed, and equipment was either sold or given to other countries. The  retained only 3,200 – after a demotion of one rank. In addition, all female soldiers (at this point it was still prohibited for women to become soldiers in the ) and all soldiers over the age of 55 were discharged.

Until 1 March 2005, Germany listed time served in the NVA as time "served in a foreign military". Service in the NVA did not count for points towards federal pensions in the unified Germany. Retired NVA soldiers and officers received only minimal pensions after unification: a thirty-year veteran would receive a pension smaller than a graduate-student stipend. After the reform of 2005, service in the NVA became known as "served outside of the ".

Many former NVA officers feel bitter about their treatment after unification. While receiving only minimal pensions, few have been able to find jobs except as laborers or security guards.

One of the few former NVA facilities to remain open was a base in Storkow near Berlin, which housed the NVA's camouflage and deception center. This became the Bundeswehr Unit for Camouflage and Deception.

Utilization of former NVA materiel after 1990 

The NVA was, in relation to its equipment and training, one of the strongest armies in the Warsaw Pact. It was equipped with a large number of modern weapons systems, most of Soviet origin, from which a small portion were given back to the Soviet Union in 1990.

The remaining equipment and materiel was still substantial, including large quantities of replacement parts, medical supplies, atomic, biological and chemical warfare equipment, training devices and simulators, etc.

One of the first measures taken after the reunification was a survey and securing of weapons and devices by former members of the NVA. The federally operated Materiel Depot Service Gesellschaft (MDSG) was charged with taking custody of and warehousing this equipment. The MDSG was privatised in 1994. Much of the materiel was given free of charge to beneficiaries in the new federal states or other departments, to museums, or to friendly nations in the context of military support for developing countries. The German Federal Intelligence Service secretly sold NVA equipment to several countries, violating international and German laws as well as international treaties.
The rest was destroyed.

 767 aircraft (helicopters, fixed wing aircraft), 24 of which were MiG-29s
 208 ships
 2,761 tanks
 133,900 wheeled vehicles
 2,199 artillery pieces
 1,376,650 firearms
 303,690 tons of ammunition
 14,335 tons of fuel and cleaning materials

24 modern MIG-29s became part of the Luftwaffe. After 1999, 23 of the 24 aircraft were given to Poland.

Recruitment and conscientious objection 

Before the construction of the Berlin Wall in 1961, military service in the GDR was voluntary, though the Free German Youth and public schools mounted intensive recruitment drives, and service in the NVA was often a prerequisite for career advancement. Compulsory military service had been introduced in 1956 in West Germany, one year after the West German military was established, but the GDR held back from this step until 1962. The situation changed when the border was sealed in August 1961, and five months later the government announced a mandatory service term of 18 months for men.

There was, at first, no alternative service for conscientious objectors.

The construction soldiers wore uniforms and lived in barracks under military discipline, but were not required to bear arms and received no combat training. In theory, they were to be used only for civilian construction projects. The GDR therefore became the only Warsaw Pact country to provide a non-combat alternative for conscientious objectors. However, fearing that other soldiers would be contaminated by pacifist ideas, the government took care to segregate the construction units from regular conscripts. Moreover, conscripts who chose the alternative service option often faced discrimination later in life, including denial of opportunities for higher education.

Organization 

The NVA had four main branches:
 The  (Ground Forces) with an active strength of 108,000 in the following divisions:
1st Motor Rifle Division (Potsdam-Eiche)
4th Motor Rifle Division (Erfurt)
6th Motor Rifle Division (Königswartha)
7th Panzer Division (Dresden)
8th Motor Rifle Division (Schwerin)
9th Panzer Division (Eggesin)
10th Motor Rifle Division (Ronneburg)
11th Motor Rifle Division (Halle)
17th Motor Rifle Division (Petersroda)
19th Motor Rifle Division (Wulkow)
20th Motor Rifle Division (Bredenfelde)
 The  (People's Navy) with a strength of 18,300
 The  (Air Forces/Air Defence) with a strength of 58,000

In wartime, mobilization of the NVA's reserves would have nearly doubled its strength. GDR authorities also had at their disposal the internal security troops of the Ministry of the Interior (the ) and the Ministry for State Security (the Felix Dzerzhinsky Guards Regiment) along with the 210,000 strong party auxiliary "Combat Groups of the Working Class", who were available in times of war.

The highest level of leadership for the NVA was the Ministry for National Defense headquartered in Strausberg near East Berlin. NVA administration was divided into the following commands:
 the  based in Geltow near Potsdam
 the  based in Strausberg
 the  based in Rostock
 the  based in Pätz near Berlin

Appearance

Uniforms 
The first military units of the Central Training Administration were dressed in police blue. With the restructuring of the Barracked Police (CIP) in 1952, khaki uniforms similar in shape and colour to those of the Soviet Army were introduced. They were of a similar cut and made of a brownish-gray, called stone gray, cloth. The dark high-necked collar was later removed, except on the coats from 1974 to 1979.

With the exceptions of the People's Navy, whose dark-blue uniforms were consistent with the styles of most navies around the world, and the Combat Groups of the Working Class, who wore their own olive-green fatigue uniforms, all NVA armed services, the Felix Dzerzhinsky Guards Regiment, the Border Troops of the German Democratic Republic, and the  wore the same basic uniform. Several later modifications were introduced, but the style and cut remain fundamentally the same. There were a variety of uniforms worn according to the setting (work or social) and season (summer or winter). Most uniforms (service, semi-dress, and parade) were stone grey, a brownish-grey colour that was conspicuously different from the grey-green of the People's Police. Officers' uniforms differed from those of enlisted personnel by better quality and texture cloth. The field and service uniforms were normal attire for most day-to-day functions.

Uniform categories 
Several basic categories of uniforms were worn:

Parade uniform 

The parade uniform for ground forces officers was the semi-dress/walking-out tunic with all authorized orders, awards and decorations attached, breeches and riding boots, steel helmet, white shirt, dark-gray necktie, and a ceremonial dagger worn on the left side and fastened to a silver-gray parade belt. Officers in guards of honor, as well as officers of cadet schools when on parade, carried sabers. In winter, a greatcoat, scarf, and gloves were worn. Naval officers wore dark blue uniforms with a peaked cap while ratings wore sailor caps.

Service uniform 
The summer service uniform for officers was a bloused jacket, called a Hemdbluse, worn without a shirt, trousers, and a visored service cap. The winter service uniform featured a tunic with four large buttoned-down patch pockets, a black waist belt, the service cap, breeches, shirt, tie, and pants belt; high boots were reserved for officers and NCOs. A long, heavy, belted greatcoat was also part of the winter uniform.

Semi-dress/walking-out uniform 
With a few details, the semi-dress uniform was the same for all ranks and was worn for walking-out purposes (i.e. off-duty and off-post). It consisted of a single-breasted tunic without belt, a silver-gray shirt with dark-gray tie, the service cap, long trousers, and black low-quarter shoes. Officers also wore the tunic with a white shirt. During periods of warm weather, there was the option of omitting the tunic, and furthermore omitting the tie. A double-breasted jacket was optional for officers and warrant officers.

Field service uniform 

In winter, a quilted stone gray padded suit without a camouflage pattern was worn over the service uniform. Later winter uniforms were also of the same camouflage pattern as the summer variant. The winter uniform also included a fur pile cap or a steel helmet, boots, knitted gray gloves, belt, and suspenders.

Work uniform 
Seasonal considerations and weather governed the kind of work uniforms worn. Generally, reconditioned articles of service uniforms (field, semi-dress, and padded winter uniforms) were dyed black and issued for all types of fatigue and maintenance details. Coveralls are also used by the lower ranks, especially armor and air force personnel. Officers in technical branches supervising fatigue details wore a laboratory-style smock.

Other uniforms 

High-ranking officers occasionally wore white uniforms (or white jackets), and staff officers were issued distinctive staff service uniforms. 

Women wore uniforms consisting of jackets, skirts or slacks, blouses, caps, boots or pumps, and other appropriate items according to season and occasion. 

Personnel, such as paratroopers, motorcyclists, and tank troops, wore additional items with their uniforms identifying them as such.

The uniforms of the Border Troops were distinguished from that of the NVA ground force and Air Force/Air Defense Force by a green armband with large silver letters identifying the wearer's affiliation.

Felix Dzerzhinsky Guards Regiment uniforms were nearly identical to those of the NVA and were distinguished primarily by the dark red MfS service color of its insignia and by an honorary cuff-band on the left sleeve bearing the regiment's name. Other Stasi officers wore a similar uniform, but without the cuff-band.

Rank insignia 

NVA personnel displayed their rank insignia on shoulder boards or shoulder loops on service, semi-dress, and parade uniforms, and subdued sleeve insignia midway between the shoulder and elbow on the left sleeve of the field uniform, coveralls, or other special uniforms. A general officer rank was denoted by five-pointed silver stars mounted on a gold and silver braided shoulder cord set on a bright red base. All other officers and NCOs wore a four-pointed star. Like many of the armies of the other Warsaw Pact countries, NVA rank insignia followed the Soviet pattern in the arrangement of stars.

The  followed similar shoulder insignia for the naval officers (who also used sleeve insignia) and enlisted ratings except that these were blue and white or yellow (in the case of naval ratings).

Awards and decorations 

The GDR had some seventy decorations for persons or groups it wished to recognize, and it bestowed them liberally. Some, such as battle decorations, were specifically set aside for armed forces personnel, many awarded to soldiers and civilians alike, and others, although ordinarily civilian awards, can on occasion be earned by those on military duty. The latter group included decorations for achievement in the arts, literature, production, and work methods. They were awarded to service personnel or specific units that participated in civil production projects or assisted during harvesting.

The Order of Karl Marx, Patriotic Order of Merit, Star of People's Friendship, Banner of Labor, Order of Scharnhorst, and the National Prize were among the more important awards. Some, including the Order of Merit and the Star of People's Friendship, were awarded in three classes. A few were accompanied by substantial monetary premiums. The NVA did not permit military personnel to wear  awards and decorations.

Periodicals 
The two main periodicals of the NVA were the weekly newspaper  and the monthly soldier's magazine .

Relics 
The former Nazi holiday complex at Prora, on the island of Rügen, contains a number of museum displays. One of these is devoted to the NVA, which had used part of the complex as a barracks. Many German military museums host former NVA equipment like tanks and aircraft.

See also 

 Conscientious objection in East Germany
 Combat Groups of the Working Class
 Felix Dzerzhinsky Guards Regiment
 Distinguished Service Medal of the National People's Army
 Military history of Germany
Bundeswehr

References

Bibliography 
 
 Tsouras, P.G. Changing Orders: The Evolution of the World's Armies, 1945 to the Present Facts On File, Inc, 1994. 
 David Stone, 'Fighting for the Fatherland: The Story of the German Soldier from 1648 to the Present Day,' Conway, London, 2006

Further reading 
 Bickford Andrew. Fallen Elites: The Military Other in Post-Unification Germany (Stanford University Press; 2011); 288 pages; An ethnographic study of former East German officers.
 Dale Roy Herspring, Requiem for an army: the demise of the East German military, Rowman & Littlefield Publishers, 1998, 9780847687183, 249 pages
 Jörg Schönbohm, Two armies and one fatherland: the end of the Nationale Volksarmee, Berghahn Books, 1996, 
 Zilian, Jr., Frederick. 'From Confrontation to Cooperation: The Takeover of the National People's (East German) Army by the Bundeswehr,' Praeger, Westport, Conn., 1999, . Reviewed by Dale R. Herspring in The Journal of Military History, July 2000, p. 912-914

External links 
 
 NVA Forum (in German)
 Nationale Volksarmee & the GDR Forum
 AHF - Nationale Volksarmee (NVA)
 RFE/RL East German Subject Files: Armed Forces, Blinken Open Society Archives, Budapest
 some formation details on NPA

 
Germany, East
National People's Army (East Germany)
National People's Army (East Germany)
Disbanded armed forces
1956 establishments in East Germany
1990 disestablishments in Germany
Warsaw Pact
Military units and formations of the Cold War